The 1966 NBA Expansion Draft was the second expansion draft of the National Basketball Association (NBA). The draft was held from April 30 to May 1, 1966, so that the newly founded Chicago Bulls could acquire players for the upcoming 1966–67 season. Chicago had been awarded the expansion team on January 16, 1966. The Bulls were the third NBA franchise to play in Chicago, following the Chicago Stags, which folded in 1950, and the Chicago Packers–Zephyrs, which moved to Baltimore and became the Baltimore Bullets in 1963.

In an NBA expansion draft, new NBA teams are allowed to acquire players from the previously established teams in the league. Not all players on a given team are available during an expansion draft, since each team can protect a certain number of players from being selected.  Before the 1966 expansion draft, the Bulls' general manager, Dick Klein, asked that each team reduce the number of protected players from eight (as initially planned) to seven. In exchange, he agreed to pick last (instead of first) in each round of that year's college draft. He also promised Red Auerbach of the Boston Celtics that he would not draft Boston's K. C. Jones, as long as Auerbach met with him to share his opinions of other players throughout the NBA.

The Bulls selected eighteen unprotected players, two from each of the nine other NBA teams. On the first day of the draft, they selected players from the Eastern Division teams; on the second day, they picked from the Western Division teams. The Bulls' selections included former first overall pick Bob Boozer, three-time All-Star Johnny Kerr and one-time All-Star Len Chappell. Kerr retired from playing prior to the start of the season, and was later named the franchise's first head coach. Another expansion draft pick, Al Bianchi, also retired as a player and was later named the team's assistant coach. Dick Klein had been planning to hire Kerr and Bianchi as coaches before the draft even took place, but because they were still under playing contracts with other teams, Klein needed to draft them instead of hiring them outright. Ten players from the expansion draft joined the Bulls for their inaugural season, but only six played more than one season for the team. Guy Rodgers—whom the Bulls acquired in exchange for Jim King and Jeff Mullins—and Jerry Sloan were named to the 1967 All-Star Game, becoming the franchise's first All-Stars.

Sloan played ten seasons with the Bulls and became the Bulls' franchise leader in games played when he retired in 1976, a record which has since been broken by Michael Jordan and Scottie Pippen. He then coached the Bulls from 1979 to 1982, and in 1988, embarked upon a coaching career with the Utah Jazz that lasted 23 years. Sloan has since been inducted into the Naismith Memorial Basketball Hall of Fame as a coach, as has fellow draftee John Thompson. The latter never worked for the Bulls in any capacity, but found success as a coach at Georgetown University.

Key

Selections

Notes
 Number of years played in the NBA prior to the draft
 Never played a game for the franchise
 Never played in the NBA prior to the expansion draft

References
General

Specific

External links
NBA.com
NBA.com: NBA Draft History

Expansion
Chicago Bulls lists
National Basketball Association expansion draft
National Basketball Association lists
NBA expansion draft
NBA expansion draft